Neptune is a noise music band from Boston, noted for having built their custom-made guitars and basses out of scrap metal. The band also plays custom-made percussion instruments and electric lamellophones.

Band history

Neptune's origins trace to 1994 as a sculpture project by Boston artist/musician Jason Sanford, who forged the band's haphazard guitars and reluctant drums from scrap steel and found objects.  Nine (+) lineups, twenty-five releases and hundreds of instruments later, the band continues to wrench its sound spatter on self-built instruments to often confounded audiences around the world. As of 2022, Neptune consists of Sanford along with long-time Neptune collaborators Mark William Pearson, Daniel Paul Boucher and, intermittently, Kevin Emil Micka.

Personnel
Jason Sidney Sanford – baritone guitar, electric thumb piano, electronics, small electric spring, percussion, vocals
Mark William Pearson – baritone guitar, bass, electronics, large electric spring, drums, percussion, vocals
Daniel Paul Boucher – drums, found object percussion, oscillators, electronics, vocals
Kevin Email Micka - recording engineer, tape manipulation, electronics, drums, percussion, guitar, vocals

Discography

Albums/LPs

"Studio Recordings, May MCMXCVII", full-length CD/LP. (Archenemy Records, 1999)
"The Ballet of Process", full-length CD/LP. (Mister/100% Breakfast Records, 2002)
"Intimate Lightning", full-length CD/LP. (Mister/100% Breakfast Records, 2004)
"Mice and Worms", 6-song 12-inch LP. (Magnetism Crafts/Self-Release, 2005)
"Patterns", full-length CD/LP. (Self-Release (US)/BBN Music (UK)/Les Potagers Natures (France), 2006)
"Neptune", full-length, LP only. (Golden lab records, 2007)
"Gong Lake", full-length CD/LP (Radium/Table of the Elements, February 2008)
"18:40/19:19", full-length LP (Magnetism Crafts/Wrong Way Archival Bureau, 2010)
"Silent Partner", full-length CD/LP/Digital (Northern Spy, 2011)
"msg rcvd", full-length CD/LP/Digital (Northern Spy, 2012)
"Mother of Millions", full-length Cassette/Digital (Wrong Way Archival Bureau, 2021)

EPs
"Knife Fight E.P.", 7-inch. (self released, 1996)
"Basement Recordings E.P.", 6-song CD. (Mister Records, 2001)
"Green Cassette", 5-song C30 Cassette. (Magnetism Crafts, 2005)
"3" CDR", 5-song CDR. (Magnetism Crafts, 2005)
"White Cassette", 4-song C20 Cassette. (Wrong Way Archival Bureau, 2005)
"3" Collage CDR", 2 songs. (Magnetism Crafts / Self-Release, 2006)
"Red Cassette", 6 improvisations, C30 Cassette. (Magnetism Crafts, 2006)
"3" CDR", 3-song 3" CDR. (Hiddenbirdhouse, 2006)
"Tell My People To Go Home", 4-song EP, split release w/ One Second Riot, LP only. (Distile Records, 2007)
"Paris Green", 5-track CDR with hand painted art. (Magnetism Crafts/Wrong Whole, 2007)
"Roman Business", 4 songs, C20 cassette. (NO=FI, March 2009)
"Cave Drawings", 6 songs, 10-inch colored vinyl. (Self-Release/Magnetism Crafts, January 2011)

Live releases
"At the Pink Pony/A Car Is A Weapon", Live 7-inch Single. (Mister Records, 2002)
"Live on Pipeline, WMBR 03.16.04" (Neptune self-released, 2019)
"Live at SCSI Cell 11.20.2004" (Neptune self-released, 2021)

Singles
"Swang!/Poodle Walk", 7-inch single. (Anti-Social Records, 1996)
"Your Company/Productivity is a Science", 7-inch single. (Heliotrope Records, 2000)

Videos
The Penetrating Gaze. Video by Bill T. Miller, recorded at the Middle East, Cambridge, MA, 12/29/2005.
Live in Strasbourg France (full set, 11 songs). Recorded live at Le Zanzibar, Strasbourg, France, 9/27/06. Video by Normaltv.org.

References

External links

 

Northern Spy Records artists
Noisecore musical groups
American musical trios
American noise rock music groups
American art rock groups
Microtonal musicians
Guitar makers
American industrial music groups
American experimental musical groups
Inventors of musical instruments